Jørgen Mads Clausen (born  23 September 1948) is the chairman of the board of Danfoss, the large Danish heating, refrigeration, and air conditioning company started by his father, Mads Clausen. He is also the chairman of DI, the association of the Danish Industry, and has a sizeable investment in the WaveStar wave energy project.

See also
List of billionaires
List of Danes by net worth

External links
Forbes.com: Forbes World's Richest People

1948 births
Living people
Danish businesspeople
Danish billionaires
People from Sønderborg Municipality